Jonathon Lillis (born August 20, 1994) is an American freestyle skier who competes internationally.
He competed for US at the FIS Freestyle Ski and Snowboarding World Championships 2017 in Sierra Nevada, Spain, where he won a gold medal in men's aerials. He competed at the 2018 Winter Olympics, finishing 8th in Aerials. 

In the 2018 Winter Olympics opening ceremony, he wore a glass pendant with some of the ashes of his youngest brother, Michael "Mikey" Lillis, who had died unexpectedly in 2017 at 17 years old. During the men's aerials event of the 2018 Winter Olympics, Jonathon Lillis wore his late brother's Team USA ski suit.  

His younger brother Christopher Lillis won an Olympic Gold medal in mix team aerials at the 2022 Winter Olympics.

References

External links

 Jon Lillis at the United States Olympic & Paralympic Committee

1994 births
Living people
American male freestyle skiers
Freestyle skiers at the 2018 Winter Olympics
Olympic freestyle skiers of the United States